This is a list of all Danish Ministers of Defence.

The current office was established in 1905, merging the two previous positions of War Minister (for army matters) and Navy Minister.

List of Ministers of Defence (1905–present)

Christian IX (1863–1906)

Frederick VIII (1906–1912)

Christian X (1912–1947)

Frederick IX (1947–1972)

Margrethe II (1972–present)
{| class="wikitable" style="text-align:center"
! rowspan=2| 
! rowspan=2| Portrait
! rowspan=2| Name
! colspan=3| Term of office
! rowspan=2| Political party
! rowspan=2| Cabinet
! rowspan=2| 
|-
! Took office
! Left office
! Time in office
|-

References

 
Defence Ministers